Guardian of the Light is the seventeenth studio album by American keyboardist and record producer George Duke. It was released in 1983 through Epic Records. Recording sessions for the album took place in Los Angeles at The Complex, Le Gonks West and Ocean Way Recording. Duke used a variety of keyboard instruments, such as Rhodes electric piano, Sequential Circuits Prophet-5, Korg Polysix, ARP Odyssey, Clavitar Solo, Minimoog, melodeon, melodica, and also Sennheiser and Roland vocoders, and LinnDrum machine. The album features contributions from various musicians, including vocalists Jeffrey Osborne and Lynn Davis, guitarists Michael Sembello and Charles Fearing, bassists Louis Johnson and Byron Miller, drummers John Robinson and Leon "Ndugu" Chancler, percussionist Paulinho da Costa, trumpeters Gary Grant and Jerry Hey, trombonist Lew McCreary, conductor George Del Barrio with a musical ensemble of string instrument players.

The album peaked at number 147 on the Billboard 200 albums chart and number 46 on the Top R&B/Hip-Hop Albums chart in the United States. Guardian of the Light spawned three singles: "Reach Out", "Celebrate" and "Born to Love You". Its lead single, "Reach Out" reached number 59 on the Hot R&B/Hip-Hop Songs chart.

Track listing

Personnel 
 George Duke – vocals (tracks: 2, 3, 6, 8, 11, 13), lead vocals (tracks: 4, 5, 9), backing vocals (tracks: 5, 9), acoustic piano (tracks: 1-6, 8, 13), Sennheiser vocoder (tracks: 2, 3), Sequential Circuits Prophet-5 (tracks: 2, 3, 7-9, 12, 13), Korg Polysix (tracks: 2, 10, 12), Rhodes electric piano (tracks: 3, 4, 6, 9, 12), melodica (track 4), ARP Odyssey and handclaps (track 8), melodeon (track 9), LinnDrum and Minimoog (tracks: 10, 12), Clavitar Solo and Roland vocoder (track 13), liner notes, producer

 Jeffrey Osborne – backing vocals (tracks: 4, 5), vocals (track 10)
 Lynn Davis – backing vocals (tracks: 4, 5, 9), handclaps (track 8)
 Portia Griffin – backing vocals (tracks: 4, 5), handclaps (track 8)
 Patti Austin – backing vocals (track 9)
 Erik Zobler – vocals (track 13)
 Michael Sembello – guitar (tracks: 1, 4, 6, 8, 9, 11)
 Charles Fearing – guitar (tracks: 2, 3)
 Johnny McGhee – guitar (track 12)
 Louis Johnson – guitar (track 5), bass (tracks: 1-3, 5, 8, 9, 13)
 Byron Lee Miller – bass (tracks: 4, 6)
 John Robinson – drums (tracks: 1-4, 8, 9)
 Leon "Ndugu" Chancler – drums (tracks: 5, 6, 13)
 Paulinho da Costa – percussion (tracks: 1, 3, 4, 6)
 Steve Forman – tabla (track 11)
 Larry Bunker – timpani (track 13)
 Rachelle Fields – handclaps (track 8)
 Larry Williams – tenor saxophone (tracks: 1, 6, 8)
 Lew McCreary – trombone (tracks: 1, 6, 8)
 Gary Grant – trumpet (track 1, 8, 13), flugelhorn (track 6), piccolo trumpet (track 13)
 Jerry Hey – trumpet (track 1, 8, 13), flugelhorn (track 6), piccolo trumpet (track 13)
 Craig Harris – vocoder programming (tracks: 2, 3)
 Paul Shure – violin, concertmaster (tracks: 1, 2, 6-8, 11)
 Charles Veal Jr. – violin, concertmaster (track 13)
 Sherrill Coltrin Baptist – violin
 Marcia Van Dyke – violin
 Israel Baker – violin
 Endre Granat – violin
 Franklin Foster – violin
 Arnold Belnick – violin
 Bonnie Douglas – violin
 Brenton Banks – violin
 Ronald Folsom – violin
 Reginald Hill – violin
 Sheldon Sanov – violin
 Robert Sushel – violin
 Kenneth Yerke – violin
 Murray Adler – violin
 Mari Botnick – violin
 Henry Ferber – violin
 Dorothy Wade – violin
 Karen Jones – violin
 Nathan Ross – violin
 Carol Shive – violin
 Assa Drori – violin
 Bob Sanov – violin
 David Schwartz – viola
 Virginia Majewski – viola
 Barbara Thomason – viola
 Allan Harshman – viola
 Denyse Buffum – viola
 Rollice Dale – viola
 Myer Bello – viola
 Raymond Kelley – cello
 Daniel Rothmuller – cello
 Douglas L. Davis – cello
 Paula Hochhalter – cello
 Julianna Buffum – cello
 Dennis Karmazyn – cello
 Earl Madison – cello
 Nils Oliver – cello
 Jan Kelley – cello
 George Del Barrio – conducting (tracks: 1, 2, 6-8, 11)
Technical
 Tommy Vicari – engineering
 Mark Ettel – assistant recording engineer (tracks: 1-11)
 Nick Spigel – assistant recording engineer
 Peter Chaikin – additional recording (track 12)
 Danny Kopelson – assistant mixing engineer (tracks: 1-11, 13)
 Wally Buck – assistant mixing engineer (tracks: 1-11, 13)
 Steve Schmidt – assistant mixing engineer (track 10)
 Brian Gardner – mastering
 Herb Cohen Management – management

Covers
"Born to Love You" was also covered by Phil Perry in 1998.

Chart history

References

External links 

George Duke's 1980s discography on his website
Guardian of the Light (Bonus Track Version) by George Duke on iTunes

1983 albums
George Duke albums
Epic Records albums
Albums produced by George Duke